Péraldi, Peraldi is an Italian and Corsican surname. Notable people with the surname include:

François Peraldi (1938–1993), Canadian psychoanalyst and linguist
Nicolas Péraldi (1841–1914), French notary who was Deputy of Corsica, then Senator of Corsica

Italian-language surnames